Prof.(Dr).Ashok Uike is an Indian politician. He was elected to the Maharashtra Legislative Assembly from Ralegaon, Maharashtra in the 2014 Maharashtra Legislative Assembly election as a member of the Bharatiya Janata Party. He was sworn as Minister of Tribal Development in Devendra Fadnavis cabinet in June 2019.
He is currently President of BJP S.T.Morcha Maharashtra State.

He shot to limelight as he defeated Four term MLA Prof. Vasant Purke, a senior leader of Congress party, former Education Minister & Deputy Speaker of the Maharashtra legislative assembly.

References

Living people
State cabinet ministers of Maharashtra
People from Yavatmal
1964 births
Marathi politicians
Members of the Maharashtra Legislative Assembly
Bharatiya Janata Party politicians from Maharashtra
Shiv Sena politicians